Lindsay Nylund (born 30 April 1958) is an Australian gymnast. He competed in eight events at the 1980 Summer Olympics.

References

External links
 

1958 births
Living people
Australian male artistic gymnasts
Olympic gymnasts of Australia
Gymnasts at the 1980 Summer Olympics
Place of birth missing (living people)
Commonwealth Games medallists in gymnastics
Commonwealth Games silver medallists for Australia
Commonwealth Games bronze medallists for Australia
Gymnasts at the 1978 Commonwealth Games
Medallists at the 1978 Commonwealth Games